Events from the year 1843 in Ireland.

Events
January – Daniel O'Connell proclaims 1843 as the "Repeal Year".
31 January – Queen's Bridge in Belfast opens.
21 February – repeal (of the Act of Union) debate in Dublin Corporation.
17 March – earthquake in the Irish Sea.
11 June
 Series of monster meetings to agitate for repeal begins at Tuam.
 O'Connell's "Mallow defiance".
15 August – repeal meeting at Tara.
17 August – Loreto Abbey, Dalkey opened as a girls' boarding and day school by the Sisters of Loreto.
18 August – Dalkey Atmospheric Railway opens unofficially.
7 October – O'Connell gives in to government prohibition of Clontarf meeting planned for the next day. However, he is charged with conspiracy a few days later.
November – Devon Commission appointed to research the problems with land leases.
Work starts on the building of Crumlin Road Prison in Belfast.
George Cannock and Andrew White establish the Dublin business that becomes Arnotts department store.

Arts and literature
Charles Lever's novel Arthur O'Leary: His wanderings and ponderings in many lands is published serially in Dublin University Magazine and Tom Burke of Ours begins serial publication in Dublin.

Births
11 January – C. Y. O'Connor, engineer in Australia (died 1902).
3 May – Edward Dowden, critic and poet (died 1913).
14 August – Thomas Workman, entomologist and arachnologist (died 1900).
6 November – William James Craig, Shakespearean scholar (died 1906).
24 November – Richard Croker, politician in America and a leader of New York City's Tammany Hall (died 1922).
21 December – Thomas Bracken, poet (died 1898 in New Zealand).
25 December
Albert Cashier, born Jennie Hodgers, soldier in the Union Army during the American Civil War, lived as a man (died 1915 in the United States).
George Fisher, Mayor of Wellington (died 1905 in New Zealand).
28 December – George Thomas Stokes, ecclesiastical historian (died 1898).
Full date unknown – Joanna Hiffernan, artists' model (died after 1903).

Deaths
19 February – Michael Joseph Quin, author, journalist and editor (born 1796).
11 May – William Vesey-FitzGerald, 2nd Baron FitzGerald and Vesey, politician and statesman (born 1783).
10 August – Robert Adrain, scientist and mathematician in America (born 1775).
16 November – Abraham Colles, professor of Anatomy, Surgery and Physiology at the Royal College of Surgeons in Ireland (born 1773).
21 December – Edward Bunting, musician (born 1773).

References

 
Years of the 19th century in Ireland
1840s in Ireland
Ireland
 Ireland